Thomas Morrison (born 30 June 1983) is an English actor who has performed in theatre, TV and film. He is best known for his appearances in On the Shore of the Wide World and as Scripps in Cast B and C of Alan Bennett's The History Boys. working alongside Steven Webb and Matt Smith.

Life and career
Morrison was born in Burnley, Lancashire and attended the Guildhall School of Music and Drama, London for three years. After graduation Thomas landed the part of Danny Holden in the BBC Television drama Blackpool, In 2011 - 2012 Thomas Morrison appeared in the ITV television drama Monroe as Lee Bradley the bed porter. He also had a role in the BBC drama The 7.39 and had a part in the 2015 BBC drama Jonathan Strange & Mr Norrell in the role of Winespill in Series 1, Episode 3.

Morrison gained his first television role in BBC One's Blackpool before stepping into theatre. His first appearances include Kes and On the Shore of the Wide World at the Royal Exchange, Manchester before then moving with the latter to the National Theatre and then featuring as Scripps in Alan Bennett's The History Boys in Casts B and C. In all three of his first theatre productions he appeared alongside co-star Steven Webb.

His later ventures included appearances in a small role in Sky One's adaptation of Terry Pratchett's The Colour of Magic in the same scene as Pratchett himself. He also played Hooper in the 2008 film adaptation of Evelyn Waugh's Brideshead Revisited.

Awards and recognition
2006 Laurence Olivier Award for Best New Play: Cast member of On the Shore of the Wide World
2004 Royal Television Society Network Newcomer – On Screen, nominee

Credits

Theatre

Television

Film

References

External links
 
 Talented British Actors Profile

Living people
English male stage actors
English male television actors
English male film actors
English male radio actors
English male voice actors
Alumni of the Guildhall School of Music and Drama
People from Burnley
Male actors from Lancashire
1983 births